NA-141 Sahiwal-I is a constituency for the National Assembly of Pakistan.

Election 2002 

General elections were held on 10 Oct 2002. Chaudhry Noraiz Shakoor Khan of PPP won by 53,174 votes.

Election 2008 

General elections were held on 18 Feb 2008. Syed Imran Ahmed Shah of PML-N won by 59,373 votes.

Election 2013 

General elections were held on 11 May 2013. Syed Imran Ahmed Shah of PML-N won by 99,553 votes and became the  member of National Assembly.

Election 2018 

General elections are scheduled to be held on 25 July 2018.

See also
NA-140 Pakpattan-II
NA-142 Sahiwal-II

References

External links 
Election result's official website

NA-160